The 2010 VMI Keydets football team represented the Virginia Military Institute during the 2010 NCAA Division I FCS football season. It was VMI's 120th football season, which dates back to 1891. In his 3rd year at VMI, the Keydets were led by head coach Sparky Woods, who became the VMI's 30th all-time football coach in 2008. VMI plays its home games at Alumni Memorial Field, as they have since 1962.

After defeating Division-II  48–6, VMI was beat by William & Mary (45–0) and Virginia (48–6), and the following week defeated conference foe Presbyterian College 24–13 in the Big South Conference opener. They were defeated heavily by Stony Brook and Liberty in the next two weeks. They finished the year 3–8 overall and 2–4 in the Big South. The program has not had a winning season since 1981.

Schedule

Game summaries

Lock Haven

William and Mary
William and Mary built a 31–0 halftime lead capped off with a fake kneel down hail mary touchdown pass to close the half, much like in the USC-UCLA game in 1986. William and Mary put in the backups and did not attempt a single pass in the second half as they coasted to their 45–0 win.

Virginia

Presbyterian

Stony Brook

Liberty

Charleston Southern

Army

Coastal Carolina

Old Dominion

Gardner-Webb

Team leaders

Rushing

Passing

Receiving

Punt returning

Interceptions

Kick returning

References

VMU
VMI Keydets football seasons
VMI Keydets football